The Land of Missing Men is a 1930 American pre-Code Western film written and directed by John P. McCarthy – with a script from Bob Quigley – and produced by Trem Carr for his studio Trem Carr Productions. Starring Bob Steele, Al St. John, Eddie Dunn, Caryl Lincoln, Al Jennings and Fern Emmett, the plot concerns Steve O'Neil (Steele) and his partner, Buckshot (St. John) who, after being accused of holding up a stagecoach in cattle country, are asked by a dying man to save his daughter from a planned stagecoach holdup.

The film was released on September 22, 1930, in the United States by Tiffany Productions, and received mostly positive reviews from critics. It was the third film in a series of Trem Carr productions starring Western actor Bob Steele, following Near the Rainbow's End and Oklahoma Cyclone (both 1930), the latter also directed by McCarthy.

Cast 
The American Film Institute lists the following cast for the film:

Bob Steele as Steve O'Neil
Al St. John as Buckshot
Eddie Dunn aa Sheriff Bower
Caryl Lincoln as Nita Madero
Al Jennings as John Evans
Fern Emmett as Martha Evans
Emilio Fernandez as López
Noah Hendricks as Texas

Production 
Production began on August 1, 1930. The sound was recorded with the RCA Photophone.

Release and reception 
The six reel Western, approximately 5,100 feet long, runs for 55 minutes, and was released on September 22, 1930, distributed in the United States by Tiffany Productions. The October 5, 1930, issue of The Film Daily called the film "a standout among Westerns", and praised the direction of McCarthy and Bob Steele's performance, adding that "Bob Steele does the best work of his career under this able direction". The October 29 issue of Variety reviewed the film less favourably, however, and considered the film to be an "average Western". J.L.K. of Exhibitors Daily Review and Motion Pictures Today (later Motion Picture Daily) criticised the screenplay but praised the performances, saying "there are many more moments that stand out as the some of the best and most original stuff ever shot in westerns ".

See also 
 Bob Steele filmography
 List of American films of 1930

References

External links 
 
 
 
 

1930 films
1930 Western (genre) films
American black-and-white films
American Western (genre) films
Films directed by John P. McCarthy
1930s English-language films
1930s American films